LazyTown is an Icelandic educational children's television series created by gymnastics champion Magnús Scheving, the CEO of LazyTown Entertainment. The program originally aired on Nickelodeon as part of the Nick Jr. block in the United States. The first two seasons consisted of fifty-two episodes, aired from 2004 to 2007. Turner Broadcasting System Europe then acquired LazyTown Entertainment in 2011 and commissioned a third season consisting of 13 episodes, which premiered on 13 March 2013 in the United Kingdom on Cartoonito. A fourth season, consisting of 13 episodes, premiered in the UK in 2014. A spin-off series entitled LazyTown Extra debuted on CBeebies on 15 September 2008.

Series overview

Season 1 (2004–2006)

Season 2 (2006–2007)

Season 3 (2013)

Season 4 (2014)

References

Episodes
Lists of children's television series episodes
Lists of Nickelodeon television series episodes
Lists of Cartoon Network television series episodes